was a  after Enpō and before Jōkyō. This period spanned the years from September 1681 through February 1684.

Change of era
 : The new era name of Tenna (meaning "Heavenly Imperial Peace") was created to mark the 58th year of a cycle of the Chinese zodiac. The previous era ended and the new one commenced in Enpō 9, on the 29th day of the 9th month.

Events of the Tenna era
 1681 (Tenna 1): In Edo, the investiture of Tokugawa Tsunayoshi as the fifth shōgun of the Edo bakufu.
 February 5, 1681 (Tenna 1, 28th day of the 12th month): The Great Tenna Fire in Edo.
 1681 (Tenna 2): A famine afflicts Heian-kyō and the nearby areas.
 March 3, 1683 (Tenna 3, 5th day of the 2nd month): Yaoya Oshichi was burned at the stake for arson.
 1683 (Tenna 3): Tokugawa shogunate grants permission for Mitsui money exchanges (ryōgaeten) to be established in Edo.
 1683 (Tenna 4): The assassination of Hotta Masatoshi signals the end of government characterized by financial sobriety and stringency, and the beginning of a swing towards extravagance and the expansive spending policies of Tsunayoshi's chamberlains.

Notes

References
 Bodart-Bailey, Beatrice. (2006). The Dog Shogun: The Personality and Policies of Tokugawa Tsunayoshi. Honolulu: University of Hawaii Press. ; ;  OCLC 470123491
 Nussbaum, Louis Frédéric and Käthe Roth. (2005). Japan Encyclopedia. Cambridge: Harvard University Press. ; OCLC 48943301
 Screech, Timon. (2006). Secret Memoirs of the Shoguns: Isaac Titsingh and Japan, 1779–1822. London: RoutledgeCurzon. ; OCLC 65177072
 Shinjō, Hiroshi. (1962). History of the Yen: 100 Years of Japanese Money-economy. Kobe: Research Institute for Economics & Business Administration, Kōbe University.  OCLC 877519 
 Titsingh, Isaac. (1834). Nihon Ōdai Ichiran''; ou,  Annales des empereurs du Japon.  Paris: Royal Asiatic Society, Oriental Translation Fund of Great Britain and Ireland. OCLC 5850691.

External links
 National Diet Library, "The Japanese Calendar" – historical overview plus illustrative images from library's collection

Japanese eras
1680s in Japan